Nanshu Lu is an associate professor at the University of Texas at Austin where she leads the Lu Research Group in the department of Aerospace Engineering and Engineering Mechanics. She also holds a courtesy appointment in the Department of Biomedical Engineering. Lu is recognized for her work on  the integration of electronics into stretchable materials compatible with human tissue, for which she was named one of the Top 35 innovators under the age of 35 by the MIT Technology Review in 2012.

Education
Nanshu Lu attended Tsinghua University in Beijing, China, graduating with a bachelor's degree in engineering mechanics in 2005. Lu earned her master's degree in applied physics in 2006 and her doctoral degree in 2009, both from Harvard University, at the Harvard School of Engineering and Applied Sciences (SEAS).  For her doctorate, she studied  solid mechanics with Zhigang Suo and Joost Vlassak.
She did postdoctoral work at the University of Illinois at Urbana–Champaign where she was a Beckman Postdoctoral Fellow from 2009-2011, working with John A. Rogers.

Career

Lu joined the Aerospace Engineering and Engineering Mechanics (ASE/EM) department at the University of Texas at Austin in 2011. There she leads the Lu Research Group in studying stretchable materials with bio-integrated electronics.

Research
Lu has been recognized for her work on the “Flexoelectricity of Nanomaterials on Deformable Substrates.” By enhancing electromechanical coupling at a nanoscale level using flexoelectricity, mechanical action can be transformed into electrical impulses.

One project which she co-lead developed a ballooncatheter, capable of monitoring  heartbeats, pressure, and temperature, while inflating inside the body.  The device can increase the safety of heart surgery.

In another project, electronics were integrated into stretchable materials to create flexible silicone devices that attach to and mimic the texture and elasticity of skin. These have been referred to as "electronic skin" or "electronic tattoos". Instead of hard and brittle silicon chips,
Lu created a flexible polymer substrate containing a mesh of nanoscale metallic ribbons. The resulting device, only 30 micrometers thick, can be printed onto a silicone patch that sticks to the skin without irritation.
Sensors in the thin "electronic skin" monitor vital signs such as pulse, temperature, and vocalization. The devices have potential application in both medical monitoring and treatment.

Awards
 2015, Office of Naval Research (ONR) Young Investigator Program Award
 2015, Air Force Office of Scientific Research (AFOSR) Young Investigator Award
 2014, 3M Non-Tenured Faculty Award
 2014, Faculty Early Career Development (CAREER) Award from the National Science Foundation
 2013, NetExplo Grand Prix, Paris, France
 2012, Top 35 innovators under the age of 35, MIT Technology Review
 2009, Beckman Postdoctoral Fellow

References

Living people
American women chemists
Chinese women chemists
21st-century American women scientists
21st-century American scientists
Harvard School of Engineering and Applied Sciences alumni
Tsinghua University alumni
Year of birth missing (living people)
Chemists from Sichuan
People from Chengdu
Educators from Sichuan
University of Texas at Austin faculty
American women academics